The Hall-Scott A-1 was an early aircraft engine. Of straight-4 configuration, it developed 40 horsepower (30 kW).

The Hall-Scott Motor Car Company began specializing in the construction of airplane engines in 1911. The Type A-1, the first one they produced, was soon being used on many types of early aircraft.

At the Third International Aviation Meet in Los Angeles in 1912, a Hall-Scott A-1 powered an aircraft designed by Jay Gage of Los Angeles and flown by Charles Stevens. During the 1912 International Aviation Meet in Oakland, Hillery Beachey, brother of famed aviator Lincoln J. Beachey, flew a biplane powered by an A-1.

Specifications

Notes

References
This article contains material that originally came from the placard at the Steven F. Udvar-Hazy Center.

External links

1910s aircraft piston engines